John Corliss may refer to:
 John Blaisdell Corliss (1851–1929), U.S. Representative from Michigan, 1895–1903
 Jack Corliss, scientist and discoverer of undersea hydrothermal vents